In Māori mythology, Rūaumoko (also known as Rūamoko) is the god of earthquakes, volcanoes and seasons. He is the youngest son of Ranginui (the Sky father) and Papatūānuku (the Earth mother) (commonly called Rangi and Papa).

Ruaumoko Patera, named after this god, is one of many paterae (shallow craters) on Io, one of Jupiter's moons.

Mythology
After Rangi and Papa were separated by their sons, Rangi cried, and his tears drenched the land. To stop this, the sons decided to turn Papa face down, so Rangi and Papa could no longer see each other's sorrow. Rūaumoko was at his mother's breast when this happened, so he was carried into the world below. He was given fire for warmth by Tama-kaka, and his movements below the earth cause earthquakes and volcanoes. Another version tells that he remains in Papa's womb, with some variants saying it was to keep Papa company after her separation from Rangi. In these versions, his movements in the womb cause earthquakes.

The earthquakes Rūaumoko causes are in turn responsible for the change of seasons. Depending on the time of year, the earthquakes cause the warmth, or cold, of Papa to come to the surface of the land, resulting in the warming, or cooling of the Earth.

Rūaumoko pulls on the ropes that control the land causing the shimmering effect of hot air, called haka of Tane-rore, and in some versions, earthquakes.

Rūaumoko is also known as husband of his niece Hine-nui-te-pō, the goddess of death and a daughter of Tāne.

In some traditions, Rūaumoko creates the Auckland volcanic field alongside his brother Mataaho, in retribution for a war between two rival tribes of patupaiarehe.

References

External links 
 Photo of carving of Rūaumoko in Te Papa
 Ruaumoko - God of Earthquakes on the Earthquake Commission website
 Earthquakes in Māori tradition article in Te Ara: The Encyclopedia of New Zealand

Māori gods
Nature gods
Earth gods
Volcano gods